Launaea socotrana is a species of flowering plant in the family Asteraceae. It is found only in Yemen.

References

socotrana
Endemic flora of Socotra
Least concern plants
Taxonomy articles created by Polbot